Evan J. Lide House, also known as Meade House, is a historic home located at Springville, Darlington County, South Carolina.  It was built about 1839, and is a rectangular, two-story gable-roofed weatherboard-clad dwelling.  It is set on a brick pier foundation and has a central hall plan. The front façade features a full-width, one-story, shed-roofed porch supported by square, solid pine posts.

It was listed on the National Register of Historic Places in 1985.

References

Houses on the National Register of Historic Places in South Carolina
Houses completed in 1839
Houses in Darlington County, South Carolina
National Register of Historic Places in Darlington County, South Carolina